Fibramia thermalis, also known as the half-barred cardinal or Sangi cardinalfish, is a species of cardinalfishes found in Indian Ocean and Pacific Ocean.

References

External links
 

Apogoninae
Fish described in 1829
Taxa named by Georges Cuvier